Hans Bergen (5 March 1890 – 17 February 1957) was a German general during World War II who commanded several divisions. He was a recipient of the Knight's Cross of the Iron Cross of Nazi Germany.

Awards and decorations

 Knight's Cross of the Iron Cross on 9 July 1941 as Oberst and commander of Infanterie-Regiment 187

References

Citations

Bibliography

External link

1890 births
1957 deaths
German Army personnel of World War I
German prisoners of war in World War II
Lieutenant generals of the German Army (Wehrmacht)
Military personnel from Munich
People from the Kingdom of Bavaria
Recipients of the clasp to the Iron Cross, 1st class
Recipients of the Knight's Cross of the Iron Cross